Melvin Cohn (1922 – October 23, 2018) was an American immunologist who co-founded the Salk Institute for Biological Studies in La Jolla, California. He demonstrated that immunoglobulins and white blood cells interact directly with pathogens to protect the body from infection, and is considered a pioneer in the research of gene regulation.

Early life 
Cohn was born in New York City in 1922. Although both of his parents worked in law, he chose to study physics at the City College of New York. After graduating in 1940, he entered the graduate school of Columbia University and earned his master's degree in chemistry.

During World War II, Cohn was drafted into the United States Army and served in a medical research unit in the Pacific Theater. After the end of the war, he was sent to Hiroshima, Japan in 1945 to study the after-effects of the atomic bombing of the city. He also diagnosed patients affected by a major diphtheria epidemic in the country.

After being discharged from the army in 1946, he attended New York University and earned his Ph.D. in biochemistry in 1949, with a specialization in immunoglobulins.

Career 
From 1949 Cohn worked in Paris, France at the Pasteur Institute, conducting research on genes and cells with the French scientist Jacques Monod, who later won the Nobel Prize in Physiology or Medicine.

From 1955 to 1958, Cohn served as professor of microbiology at the Washington University School of Medicine in St. Louis, Missouri. In 1959, he moved to Stanford University in Palo Alto, California, where he was professor of biochemistry. Cohn's reputation as a leading researcher in molecular biology attracted the attention of Jonas Salk, who was planning to build the Salk Institute for Biological Studies. They struck a friendship as Cohn drove Salk around the San Francisco Bay Area looking at potential sites.

In 1961, when Salk decided to build his institute in La Jolla in Southern California, he invited Cohn and Renato Dulbecco to serve as co-founders, which they both accepted despite the risks involved in joining a new venture which was still short of money. Cohn's wife, biologist Suzanne Bourgeois, also joined them.

Cohn studied the immune system at the Salk Institute for the next 57 years. He demonstrated that immunoglobulins and white blood cells react directly to pathogens to protect the body from infection, and developed computer models to predict the immune system's response to infections.

Personal life 
Cohn married Ruby Burman, a theater scholar and authority on Samuel Beckett, in 1946. They divorced in 1961. He later married again, to biologist Suzanne Bourgeois.

Cohn died in San Diego, California on October 23, 2018, at the age of 96.

Honors and recognition 
Some of the honors and awards Cohn had received:

 Eli Lilly and Company-Elanco Research Award (1956) 
 Honorary Member of the Scandinavian Society for Immunology (1978)
 Member of the American Academy of Arts and Sciences (1980)
 Sandoz Prize in Basic Immunology (1995)

References 

1922 births
2018 deaths
20th-century American biochemists
American immunologists
City College of New York alumni
Columbia Graduate School of Arts and Sciences alumni
New York University alumni
Washington University School of Medicine faculty
Stanford University faculty
Pasteur Institute
Scientists from New York City
Military personnel from New York City
United States Army personnel of World War II
American microbiologists
Fellows of the American Academy of Arts and Sciences
Salk Institute for Biological Studies people